Orsa Basket Barcellona is an Italian professional basketball team based in Barcellona Pozzo di Gotto, Sicily. The team plays in the Serie B.

Notable players

External links
Official website 
Team Profile at Eurobasket.com

1976 establishments in Italy
Basketball teams established in 1976
Basketball teams in Sicily